The 1963 Fresno State Bulldogs football team represented Fresno State College—now known as California State University, Fresno—as a member of the California Collegiate Athletic Association (CCAA) during the 1963 NCAA College Division football season. Led by Cecil Coleman in his fifth and final season as head coach, Fresno State compiled an overall record of 4–6 with a mark of 2–2 in conference play, placing fourth in the CCAA. The Bulldogs played home games at Ratcliffe Stadium on the campus of Fresno City College in Fresno, California.

Schedule

Team players in the NFL/AFL
The following were selected in the 1964 NFL Draft.

The following were selected in the 1964 AFL Draft.

References

Fresno State
Fresno State Bulldogs football seasons
Fresno State Bulldogs football